Luang Nuea, Lampang is a village and tambon (subdistrict) of Ngao District, in Lampang Province, Thailand. In 2005 it had a total population of 5020 people. The tambon contains  6 villages.

References

Tambon of Lampang province
Populated places in Lampang province